The L78 was a Big-Block engine produced by Chevrolet between 1965 and 1970. Between 1966 and 1969 it was the most powerful Regular Production Option engine available in Chevrolet's intermediate line, making it a highly-collectible muscle car engine today.

History
The second-generation Chevrolet Big-Block engine was introduced at the 1963 Daytona 500 as the Mark II. The block entered production in mid 1965 as the Mark IV  "Turbo-Jet," phasing out the first-generation W-series Big-Block. In its first year the 396 was available as the L78 option in Corvettes and full-sized (Impala, Bel Air, Biscayne) models, and as the L37 in the intermediate (Chevelle) model. These engines differed only in that the L78 had a solid-lifter camshaft, while the L37 had a hydraulic lifter cam shaft.

In 1966 the L78 was available exclusively in the intermediate line. For 1967 the engine was additionally available in Chevrolet's new pony car, the Camaro. The following year the motor became available in the compact Chevy II also.

For the 1970 model year the 396 was bored , resulting in a  engine. Despite this, the motor was still badged as a 396. 1970 was also the final production year for the L78. Although 1970 LS6 Chevelles are generally more collectible today, 1970 L78 Chevelles are in fact rarer (4,475 units versus 2,144).

Between 1966 and 1969 the L78 was the highest-horsepower engine available in Chevrolet's intermediate line via a Regular Production Option (RPO). Despite this, in 1969 an L72 ,  engine could be ordered in an intermediate via a Central Office Production Order (COPO). Only 323 of these cars were produced. With the lifting of the restriction in 1970 and the introduction of the 454, the COPO option in Chevelles was discontinued.

L89
A version of the L78 was also produced with aluminum cylinder heads and sold as RPO L89. This engine was available from 1968 to 1970.

Production numbers

L78

 * 54 of these were converted into L72 Yenko Super Camaros.
 ** 64 of these were converted into L72 Yenko Super Camaros.

L78/L89

References
DeMauro, Thomas A. "Simultaneous Combustion - 1967 Chevrolet Chevelle SS L78: How a 1967 Chevelle SS L78 396/375-hp tribute project led to restoring a numbers-matching original--at the same time." In Hemmings Muscle Machines. August 2014.
Niedermeyer, Paul. "1965 Chevelle SS396 Z16: 201 Built, And A Common 396 Engine Misunderstanding Finally Resolved." In Cubside Classic Online. http://www.curbsideclassic.com/blog/1965-chevelle-ss396-z16-201-built-and-a-common-396-engine-misunderstanding-resolved/.
Zazarine, Paul. "1969 L78 SS396 Chevelle - The Factory's Fastest." In Super Chevy Online. http://www.superchevy.com/features/sucs-0732-1969-chevelle-l78/.

Chevrolet engines
V8 engines
Gasoline engines by model
Regular Production Option